Llywernog Mine is an 18th-century silver-lead mine in Llywernog, Ponterwyd, Ceredigion, Wales, currently run as an industrial heritage museum and tourist attraction. Exploiting the mineralised rocks of the Central Wales Orefield, it is one of many silver-lead mines in Wales, and unlike many others it still has a large number of intact buildings and mining equipment, much of which has been restored as part of the museum.

The first vein of galena, an ore consisting of silver and lead, was discovered around 1742, and active mining commenced in the 1770s. Intermittent mining interspersed with phases of idleness and many changes of management continued for over a century until 1891, when low lead prices forced the mine to close. The mine was briefly active again from 1907 to 1911, when  zinc was extracted.

In 1974 restoration work began, and the site opened as a museum later that year.

Related mines 
There were four mines, including Llywernog, within a one-mile radius. The other three are Powell's mine to the West of Llywernog, Clara mine to the East, and Ponterwyd mine East of Clara, but Llywernog is the only one with any visible buildings left.

Another mine called the Bog, or Craignant Bach, is located to the North-East of Llywernog, or North of Ponterwyd.

Bodcoll mine is to the South-East of Llywernog, near Devil's Bridge.

History

Early history (1742–1825) 
The discovery of the first galena vein was made around 1742. The site was leased to Lewis Morris by D. Jones in 1749, but there is no evidence of work at the mine from before Moris' death in 1765. No lease records can be found until October 1, 1789, when Margaret Pyrse leased the mine to John Pierce, William Poole, and John Jones.

Mining likely begun in the 1770s, after the construction of a turnpike road which made ore transport by pony easier. By 1791 there were 60 employed miners. At this time, there was at least one water wheel, called the "engine", and jobs included deepening the main shaft, pumping water, mining and raising ore, cutting ground, and making preparations for the engine.

By 1795 there were at least two water wheels in operation, but work stopped in the Summer of that year due to water shortages.

Around 1810 another water wheel was constructed for draining the mine. At this time the mine was in the possession of Poole, and after this period the mine is sometimes known as "Poole's mine".

A draft lease suggests that the site was leased to Michael Williams and William Williams of Scorrier House, Gwennap, Cornwall, partners of Williams, Foster, and Co., in 1825, who leased many other mines in Cardiganshire between 1825 and 1840. However, just two years later they tried to rescind their lease, as the price of lead had fallen to a level which made Llywernog unprofitable.

Rheidol United Mines Company and Llywernog Mines Company (1840–1852) 
The next records of the mine are from 1840, when it was being worked by William Lewis, who was trying to sell it and the nearby Powell's mine for £500, including tools, pumps, two water wheels, and twelve tons of ore. The original plan was for the mine to be run by a new company with shareholders consisting of the buyer Robert Dunkin of Llanelli, the seller Lewis, Matthew Francis who advised Dunkin on the sale, and a J.H. Shears.

Dunkin also bought the Rhiwrugos (now known as Erwtomau) and Nantglas mines, located a couple of miles south-west of Llywernog in the Rheidol Valley. Together with Llywernog, the three mines were all run under a single company, the Rheidol United Mines Company, managed by Lewis, Dunkin, and Francis.

By 1843 Shears and Dunkin had fallen into disagreement, and Shears bought Dunkin's shares. The three mines were now in the hands of Shears, which he ran under the name Llywernog Mines Company. By 1845 he had relinquished the three mines.

J. Holdsworth held a take-note for the mine in 1851, and took out a lease in 1852, but no records show any ore sold by his company.

Llywernog United Mining Company (1858–1861) 
In 1858 the new Llywernog United Mining Company was formed to run the Llywernog, Ponterwyd, and Bog mines. Not much work was done during this period.

John Barton Balcombe (1861–1875) 

Balcome & Co., run by John Barton Balcombe, Took over running of the Clara mine in 1861, and Llywernog a few months later in the same year. They paid £2,000 to the Llywernog United Mining Company for Llywernog. They installed a 40-foot water wheel from Bodcoll mine to fully drain the mine.

In 1863 there were 14 men working at the mine, and work continued throughout the 1860s.

The Llywernog Mining Company was formed in 1868, managed by Balcombe. In response to this, a 16-horsepower steam engine was installed in December. The price of purchasing and transporting coal was high, so the engine was only used when the water wheels could not be run.

The yield and price of lead during this period were low, leading to a new Llywernog Mining Company being floated in 1872, retaining Balcombe but replacing the mine captain. Work continued until 1873, but water began to rise in the mine again and work stopped. Some work was done from 1874, but there are no records of ore being sold after 1873. A 50-foot water wheel was constructed in 1875, powered by a 6- or 7-mile leat system.

Powell Mines Company (1875–1891) 
In 1875 Balcombe was imprisoned for embezzlement, but work continued as an annexe of Powell's mine. By the end of the 1870s the mine was idle, but in 1882 the Powell Mines Company, run by Nicholas Bray and Evan Hanson took over at Llywernog. Balcombe's lease from 1870 was still valid, but though the terms had been violated, mining continued. In 1886 a Deed of Revocation was served for violation of the lease, but Bray and Hanson instead paid £16 a year until it expired in 1891. Little was accomplished during this time, but the main shaft was renamed to "Hanson's Shaft", after the co-director of the company.

Low lead prices in 1891 forced many mines, including Powell's and Llywernog, to close.

Zinc mining and closure (1907–1914) 
In 1907, Scottish Cardigan Mines, Ltd. leased the mine for its zinc prospects. The 50-foot wheel completely pumped out the mine and Hanson's Shaft was re-timbered, but by 1911 the price of zinc had fallen again and the mine was closed.

There is record of some work done by Thomas Jenkins in 1914, but he did not have much success.

The 50-foot water wheel, which could be seen from the A44, was demolished in 1953 after falling into a state of disrepair.

Restoration and mining museum (1973–) 

In 1973, Peter Lloyd Harvey, Dr S. H. Harvey, and Bob Griffin formed the Mid Wales Mining Museum Ltd., and obtained a lease to develop the site. Restoration work began in 1974, and after restoring some of the mine buildings the site opened to the public as a heritage museum in August. Work continued throughout the 1970s and 1980s, restoring the buildings and mining equipment, and clearing the underground tunnels.

Balcombe's Level, the prospecting adit last opened by Balcombe, was the first underground area to be cleared and made accessible to the public.

References 

Lead mines in Wales
Mining museums in Wales
History of Ceredigion